The Snare River is a river in the Northwest Territories, Canada.

It is located close to the Snare River Airport, owned by the Northwest Territories Power Corporation, which serves the hydro system.

References

Rivers of the Northwest Territories